August Harambašić (14 July 1861 – 16 July 1911) was a Croatian writer, poet, publisher, politician and translator from the 19th century.

He was born in Donji Miholjac, and studied law in Vienna and Zagreb. Politically he followed the sharp line of Ante Starčević's Croatian Party of Rights, which landed him in jail several times. He was a representative in the Croatian Parliament from 1901. He was an editor and reporter for various periodicals.  He died in Zagreb.

Harambašić translated various books of famous authors into Croatian.

See also
 Lavoslav Vukelić

References

External links

 

1861 births
1911 deaths
Croatian nationalists
People from Donji Miholjac
Croatian writers
Representatives in the Croatian Parliament (1848–1918)
Party of Rights politicians